Queso frito (English: fried cheese) is a fried cheese dish. It consists of a white, salty cheese with a high melting point called queso de freír (Spanish: frying cheese), queso paisa, or queso fresco (fresh cheese) or queso blanco (white cheese). Queso frito is made throughout South America, Puerto Rico, the Dominican Republic, and Mexico.

See also 
 Fried cheese

References

Colombian cuisine
Dominican Republic cuisine
Nicaraguan cuisine
Puerto Rican cuisine
Mexican cuisine
Cheese dishes